Fortitude was a barque launched at Scarborough in 1842. In the 1840s she brought free settlers to the colonies of South Australia and Queensland. Thereafter she sailed to India and China, and made one more voyage carrying female immigrants to Port Phillip. She was wrecked circa 1866.

History
Fortitude first appeared in Lloyd's Register (LR) in 1842.

Migrants to South Australia
Fortitude, Captain James Douglas, arrived in South Australia on 5 April 1842, bringing 27 free settlers to Adelaide.

Migrants to Queensland
In 1848–9, she was the first of three ships chartered by the Rev Dr John Dunmore Lang to bring free immigrants to Brisbane, Australia, arriving on 21 January 1849. Captained by John Christmas, with the medical superintendent Henry Challinor, she departed Gravesend on 14 September 1848 and arrived at Moreton Bay on 21 January 1849.

Subsequent trade

In 1852–1853, Fortitude. Captain Heyward, carried 50 women to Port Phillip. The women were the 21st party to travel under the auspices of the Female Emigration Fund. Some women who paid their own way also made the journey.

With the change of ownership from Tidalls to Guy, Fortitudes homeport changed from Sunderland to Newry.

Fate
In 1865 Fortitude, Booth, master, sailed to Toulon, then Singapore, and back to London. There is no readily available ship arrival and departure data after her return in November 1865. A typhoon drove a barque named Fortitude ashore at Kowloon, damaging her. It this point it is a conjecture that the barque in Kowloon was the Fortitude of this article.

LR for 1866 carried the annotation "Wrecked" under Fortitudes name.

Notable immigrants on the Fortitude

South Australia
W.P. Auld, Adelaide vigneron and explorer
James Philcox, land speculator who named two villages (now suburbs) in Adelaide

Brisbane

 Henry Challinor, physician and politician of Ipswich
 Robert Cribb, politician of Brisbane
 William Pettigrew, politician and mayor of Brisbane
 Edward Barton Southerden, draper and mayor of Sandgate

Notes

Citations

External links

  — more information on the three immigrant ships, including passenger lists

1842 ships
Ships built in England
History of immigration to Australia
Sailing ships of the United Kingdom
History of Queensland
Pre-Separation Queensland
Migrant ships to Australia